This is a list of the main career statistics of professional Dutch tennis player Kiki Bertens.

Performance timelines

Only main-draw results in WTA Tour, Grand Slam tournaments, Fed Cup/Billie Jean King Cup and Olympic Games are included in win–loss records.

Singles
Current through Tennis at the 2020 Summer Olympics.

Doubles

Notes

Significant finals

WTA Tour Championships

Doubles: 1 (runner-up)

WTA Elite Trophy

Singles: 1 (1 runner-up)

Premier Mandatory & Premier 5 tournaments

Singles: 3 (2 titles, 1 runner-up)

WTA career finals

Singles: 15 (10 titles, 5 runner-ups)

Doubles: 16 (10 titles, 6 runner-ups)

ITF Circuit finals

Singles: 11 (7 titles, 4 runner–ups)

Doubles: 13 (11 titles, 2 runner–ups)

Career Grand Slam statistics

Seedings
The tournaments won by Bertens are in boldface, and advanced into finals by Bertens are in italics.

Record against other players

No. 1 wins

Record against top 10 players
Bertens' match record against players who have been ranked in the top 10, with those who are active in boldface.

Top 10 wins

References

External links

Tennis career statistics